Trap jaw may refer to:

 Trap-jaw ants, carnivorous ants of family Formicidae
 Trap jaw snakes, venomous pit vipers found in the United States
 Trap Jaw, a fictional cyborg villain from Masters of the Universe